Trevélez is a village in the province of Granada, Spain. Its population in 2011 was estimated at 823. The river Trevélez flows through the village. They are located in the western part of the Alpujarras region.
Two of the highest mountains in Spain, Mulhacén and Alcazaba, are just to the north of the village, a few hours' walk away.

Located at a height of 1486 metres, Trevélez is not the highest recognised municipality in Spain. That honour goes to Valdelinares located in the Sierra de Gúdar range of the Sistema Ibérico, in the province of Teruel, Aragon, Spain. It lies at the confluence of the Río Trevélez with a smaller stream, to the southwest of Mulhacén, the highest peak of the Sierra Nevada and of the Iberian peninsula. The village lies to the west of the Río Trevélez. It is divided into three parts, the Barrios Bajo, Medio and Alto (lower, mid and upper quarters), with 200 metres of altitude difference between the highest and lowest points. The only bridge over the river is in the Barrio Bajo. The Barrio Bajo is a significant tourist centre, while the Barrios Medio and Alto are more typically Alpujarran in style, though tourism is important to the economy of the entire village. To the west, the nearest village is Busquístar; the road through the Bajo Barrio continues to the east and south to Juviles and Torvizcón.  There is a regular bus service along this road, linking the village to the regional centres of Lanjarón and Órgiva as well as the provincial capital, Granada.

Trevélez is famous for the quality of its air-cured hams, a speciality throughout the Alpujarras but particularly associated with the village, because the dry climate due to its altitude makes for ideal conditions for storing them.

Trevélez celebrates the day of the Virgen de Las Nieves (Virgin of the Snows - see article in external links) in the summer months. On this day the virgin is carried to the summit of Mulhacén and a mass is celebrated. The traditional belief is that this will keep travellers safe in the Sierra Nevada for another year.

Photo gallery

References

External links

Municipalities in the Province of Granada